Rubus arenicola, the sanddwelling dewberry, is an uncommon North American species of flowering plant in the rose family. It is found in eastern Canada (Nova Scotia) and the northeastern United States (New York, Massachusetts, Maine, New Hampshire, Rhode Island).

The genetics of Rubus is extremely complex, so that it is difficult to decide on which groups should be recognized as species. There are many rare species with limited ranges such as this. Further study is suggested to clarify the taxonomy.

References

arenicola
Plants described in 1906
Flora of the Northeastern United States
Flora of Nova Scotia